Manganese lactate is an organic chemical compound, a salt of manganese and lactic acid with the formula Mn(C3H5O3)2. The compound forms light pink crystals, soluble in water, forming crystalline hydrates.

Synthesis
Dissolution of manganese carbonate in lactic acid solution:
 MnCO3 + 2C3H6O3 → Mn(C3H5O3)2 + CO2 + H2O

Physical properties
Manganese lactate forms light pink crystals.

Manganese lactate is soluble in water and ethanol.

Manganese lactate forms crystalline hydrates of composition Mn(C3H5O3)2•n H2O, where n = 2 and 3. Each lactate is a bidentate ligand. Two water molecules coordinate directly to the metal as well, cis to each other, to complete the octahedral cluster. In the trihydrate, the third water molecule is involved in hydrogen-bonding further away in the crystal structure.

Its dihydrate forms an orthorhombic crystal, the space group is P212121.

The trihydrate is a monoclinic crystal, and the space group is P21.

References

Lactates
Manganese compounds